The Chrono series is a video game franchise developed and published by Square Enix (formerly Square). It began in 1995 with the time travel role-playing video game Chrono Trigger, which spawned two continuations, Radical Dreamers and Chrono Cross. The music of Chrono Trigger was mainly composed by Yasunori Mitsuda, with a few tracks composed by regular Final Fantasy composer Nobuo Uematsu. The Chrono Trigger soundtrack has inspired four official album releases by Square Enix: a soundtrack album released by NTT Publishing in 1995 and re-released in 2004, a greatest hits album published by DigiCube in 1999, published in abbreviated form by Tokyopop in 2001, and republished by Square Enix in 2005, an acid jazz arrangement album published and republished by NTT Publishing in 1995 and 2004, and a 2008 orchestral arranged album by Square Enix. Corresponding with the Nintendo DS release of the game, a reissued soundtrack was released in 2009. An arranged album for Chrono Trigger and Chrono Cross, entitled To Far Away Times, was released in 2015 to commemorate the 20 year anniversary of Chrono Trigger.

The original soundtrack has been hailed as one of the best video game soundtracks ever made, and the Original Sound Version album met with similar applause.  The reception for the other albums has been mixed, with the releases finding both fans and detractors among reviewers. Pieces from the soundtrack have been played at various orchestral concerts, such as the personal arrangements by Mitsuda for the Play! A Video Game Symphony concert series. Chrono Cross music has also been extensively remixed by fans, and such remixes have been included in both official and unofficial albums.

Creation and development
Chrono Trigger was scored primarily by Yasunori Mitsuda, with assistance by veteran Final Fantasy composer Nobuo Uematsu. A sound programmer at the time, Mitsuda was unhappy with his pay and threatened to leave Square if he could not compose music. Final Fantasy developer Hironobu Sakaguchi, one of the three designers for the upcoming Chrono Trigger, suggested he score the game, remarking, "maybe your salary will go up." Mitsuda reflected, "I wanted to create music that wouldn't fit into any established genre...music of an imaginary world. The game's director, Masato Kato, was my close friend, and so I'd always talk with him about the setting and the scene before going into writing." Mitsuda has said that he was unsure of how to start, saying that he "must've tried to start writing the music 4 times" and that it took "a month and a half" before he knew how to compose the music for Chrono Trigger.

Mitsuda slept in his studio several nights, and attributed certain tracks, such as "To Far Away Times", to inspiring dreams. He later attributed this track to an idea he was developing before Chrono Trigger, reflecting that the piece was made in dedication to "a certain person with whom I wanted to share a generation." Mitsuda tried to use leitmotifs of the Chrono Trigger main theme to create a sense of consistency in the soundtrack. He also suffered a hard drive crash that lost around forty in-progress tracks. After Mitsuda contracted stomach ulcers, regular Final Fantasy series composer Nobuo Uematsu joined the project to compose ten tracks and finish the score. Mitsuda returned to watch the ending with the staff before the game's release, crying upon seeing the finished scene. Mitsuda considers Chrono Trigger a landmark title which helped his talent mature. While Mitsuda later held that the title piece was "rough around the edges," he maintains that it had "significant influence on my life as a composer." At the time of the game's release, the number of tracks and sound effects was unprecedented, causing the soundtrack to span three discs in its 1995 commercial pressing.

Albums

Chrono Trigger Original Sound Version

Chrono Trigger Original Sound Version is a soundtrack of the music from Chrono Trigger, produced by Yasunori Mitsuda and Mitsunobu Nakamura. The soundtrack spans three discs and 64 tracks, covering a duration of 2:39:52. It was published by NTT Publishing on March 25, 1995 and re-published on October 1, 2004.

The majority of the tracks were composed by Yasunori Mitsuda, while ten tracks were contributed by Nobuo Uematsu after Mitsuda contracted stomach ulcers. Noriko Matsueda composed one track, "Boss Battle 1", which was arranged by Uematsu. The soundtrack tunes have been described as covering a wide variety of moods, from "simple, light-hearted tunes" like "Spekkio" to "sad themes" like "At The Bottom of Night" and "darker themes" like "Ocean Palace".

The album was well received by reviewers such as Liz Maas of RPGFan, who termed it "well worth its price" and noted that the tracks were very memorable and "always fit the mood in the game". IGN termed it "one of the best videogame soundtracks ever produced" and said that the music was a large part of the game's ability to "capture the emotions of the player". It furthermore called the soundtrack "some of the most memorable tunes in RPG history". The game itself won the "Best Music in a Cartridge-Based Game" award in Electronic Gaming Monthly's 1995 video game awards.

The original CDs for both releases were only published in Japan and include only Japanese track names. The official English track names were later released on Chrono Trigger Official Soundtrack: Music from Final Fantasy Chronicles and Chrono Trigger Original Soundtrack [DS Version].

Track listings

Chrono Trigger Arranged Version: The Brink of Time

Chrono Trigger Arranged Version: The Brink of Time is an album of acid jazz rearrangements of the music from Chrono Trigger, arranged and performed by GUIDO (Hiroshi Hata and Hidenobu Ootsuki). The soundtrack spans one disc and 10 tracks, covering a duration of 52:47. It was published by NTT Publishing on June 25, 1995, and reprinted on October 1, 2004.

The Brink of Time came about because Mitsuda wanted to do something that no one else was doing, and he noted that acid jazz and its related genres were uncommon in the Japanese market. It was the first album for which Mitsuda had to work with live recordings. The cover art of the album depicts a plate of fried eggs between a fork, knife and glass, while the inside booklet depicts a rooster which was specifically brought into the studio for the photo shooting. Several eggs had to be fried before the designers could settle on the correct shape. Mitsuda has stated that Ootsuki's arrangement technique left a strong impact on him and notably influenced his next score, the soundtrack to Front Mission: Gun Hazard.

The album received mixed reviews from critics.  Freddie W. of RPGFan, while calling the album "pretty good" overall, said that several of the tracks including "Zeal Palace" and "Warlock Battle" were "absolutely horrible" due to the "disgustingly bad" distorted guitars. He cited the overuse of guitars as the worst part of the album. Simon of Square Enix Music Online had a different reaction; he enjoyed the guitars in the tracks and said that the album had "skill, class, and a feel that's relatively original". He concluded, however, that he could not seem to "connect" with the album, and that the CD was "very much down to personal taste — a love or hate arrangement".

Chrono Trigger Original Soundtrack
Chrono Trigger Original Soundtrack, also referred to as "Chrono Trigger '99" or "Chrono Trigger PSX OST", is a greatest hits album featuring 21 tracks from Chrono Trigger Original Sound Version and nine arranged tracks from the release of Chrono Trigger for the PlayStation. The arranged tracks come from the cutscenes added to the game, while Tsuyoshi Sekito composed four new pieces for the game's bonus features that weren't included on the soundtrack. The album was released by DigiCube on December 18, 1999 to coincide with the PlayStation release and re-released by Square Enix on February 23, 2005. The album is 1:14:12 long and spans 30 tracks.

A version of the album was re-published by Tokyopop in North America as Chrono Trigger Official Soundtrack: Music From Final Fantasy Chronicles on August 21, 2001, to coincide with the release of the Final Fantasy Chronicles collection of Final Fantasy IV and Chrono Trigger. The first 21 tracks of the album out of 25 were identical to Chrono Trigger Original Soundtrack, while the next three tracks corresponded to tracks 22, 23, and 29 of the Original Soundtrack and the final track was the same as the first track of Brink of Time. This version of the album is 1:13:03 long.

Original Soundtrack received mixed reviews by critics. Ryan Mattich of RPGFan termed it "an excellent selection of music", primarily due to the arranged tracks, saying that the Original Sound Version album's tracks were better than this version's as they were looped and thus played longer. Patrick Gann was disparaging of the North American version of the CD, however, saying that its shortened track list destroyed the main reason to buy the album. Don Kotowski of Square Enix Music Online was dismissive of the Original Soundtrack album, saying that while the Original Sound Version tracks truly represented the "best of" the game's soundtrack, the arranged tracks were "either too short, too much like the original, or lifeless compared to the original", giving no incentive to purchase the album over the Original Sound Version.

Chrono Trigger Orchestra Extra Soundtrack
Chrono Trigger Orchestra Extra Soundtrack is an album of orchestral arrangements of Chrono Trigger pieces, arranged by Natsumi Kameoka. Published by Square Enix on November 20, 2008 exclusively as a pre-order bonus of the Nintendo DS port of Chrono Trigger, this soundtrack consists of two tracks, "Chrono Trigger ~Orchestra Version~" and "Chrono Trigger Medley ~Orchestra Version~", the latter spanning the pieces "A Premonition", "Guardia's Millennial Fair", "Yearnings of the Wind", "Frog's Theme", "Battle with Magus", "Epilogue ~To Good Friends~", and "To Far Away Times". Mitsuda expressed difficulty in selecting the pieces for the orchestral medley, eventually picking a track from each era and certain character themes. While both tracks involve a full orchestra, "Chrono Trigger" is more heavily horn-based, while "Medley" relies more on stringed instruments. The CD itself came in a single sleeve with a short note from primary composer Yasunori Mitsuda. The album as a whole has a length of 6:18, with "Chrono Trigger" lasting 2:07 and "Medley" having a length of 4:11.

The album has been described as showing that Mitsuda was "well ahead of the curve" when he composed the Chrono Trigger soundtrack.  IGN described "Chrono Trigger ~Orchestra Version~" as having a heavy 1970's influence and as being "a testament to Mitsuda's compositional skills", while calling "Chrono Trigger Medley ~Orchestra Version~" "playfully romantic" with "a fairy tale element" in the beginning of the piece that later transforms into "an entirely more grandiose arena". Patrick Gann described the soundtrack as "awesome" and said that "Kameoka is really good at orchestral arrangement". His primary complaint was the length of the album, as he wished it had been a full album instead of a "mini-album" of only two tracks.

Chrono Trigger Original Soundtrack (2009 release)
Chrono Trigger Original Soundtrack is a Square-Enix re-release of the Chrono Trigger Original Sound Version soundtrack that was made available for purchase on July 29, 2009. This soundtrack corresponds to the Nintendo DS version of Chrono Trigger, with different instrumentation from the original Super NES version. This 3 disc soundtrack contains additional tracks that were not included on the original release, as well as a bonus DVD.

The track lengths for a number of tracks on all three discs are different than the Original Sound Version release. On the first disc, tracks 24-27 are new arranged version tracks that were included as the music from those tracks corresponded to the video animated sequences that were added originally on the PlayStation version. The same applied to tracks 25–27 on the second disc and tracks 18–24 on the third disc.

The Bonus DVD included a special Mitsuda interview and two music videos for the tracks that were on the Orchestra Extra album: "Chrono Trigger ~Orchestra Version~" and "Chrono Trigger Medley ~Orchestra Version~".

The asterisk indicates the additional tracks that were not in the original Original Sound Version.

Track listings

To Far Away Times: Chrono Trigger & Chrono Cross Arrangement Album
On a live performance at the Tokyo Dome in July 2015 commemorating the 20 year anniversary of Chrono Trigger, Mitsuda announced that the long requested Chrono series arrangement album, entitled To Far Away Times: Chrono Trigger & Chrono Cross Arrangement Album would be released. This was eventually released by Square Enix Music on October 14, 2015.

Chrono Orchestra
In 2019, Square Enix held a pair of concerts by the Tokyo Philharmonic Orchestra in Osaka on September 7 and in Tokyo on October 27, featuring music from Chrono Trigger and Chrono Cross. On September 4, 2019, Square Enix released the album Chrono Trigger Orchestral Arrangement, containing eight tracks arranged by Kosuke Yamashita, Mariam Abounnasr, Daisuke Shinoda, and Tomomichi Takeoka, and performed by the Tokyo Philharmonic Orchestra. A box set containing the album, a similar album of orchestral arrangements for Chrono Cross, and a bonus disc of two piano duet arrangements for each game was also released. The album and box set were reviewed by Tien Hoang of VGMOnline, who found it to be a short album of "pleasant but unambitious" arrangements that stuck closely to the original compositions. He found the piano arrangements in the box set to be better, but uneven.

Covers and adaptations
Music from Chrono Trigger Original Sound Version has been arranged for the piano and published as sheet music by DOREMI Music Publishing. Chrono Trigger soundtrack has been heavily remixed by fans, sparking several albums. These include the officially licensed Time & Space - A Tribute to Yasunori Mitsuda, released by OneUp Studios on October 7, 2001 and containing 18 remixes over a span of 1:00:58, with a second version of the album released on June 17, 2003. In 2009, another album, "Chronotorious", was released by the same band under the name "Bad Dudes". Another album release was Chrono Symphonic, an unofficial download-only album release by the remix website OverClocked ReMix on January 3, 2006 containing 25 remixes over 2 "discs". Selections of remixes also appear on Japanese remix albums, called Dōjin, and on English remixing websites such as OverClocked Remix. In 2013, Video game composer Blake Robinson officially licensed the compositions and released his new arrangements as "The Chrono Trigger Symphony". Volume 1, 2 and 3 are available for paid download from iTunes and Loudr.
Video game cover artist Malcolm Robinson also licensed and released arrangements of 30 pieces from the soundtrack as "Chrono Trigger: Orchestral Selections". Volume 1 and 2 (Published in 2015 and 2019, respectively) each contain 15 remixes, and are available from iTunes and Spotify.

Live performances

The main theme of Chrono Trigger was played at the fifth of the Orchestral Game Music Concerts in 1996, and released on an accompanying album. Mitsuda has arranged versions of music from Chrono Trigger for Play! A Video Game Symphony video game music concerts in 2006, presenting the main theme, Frog's Theme, and To Far Away Times. Music from the game has also been performed in other video game concert tours such as the Video Games Live concert series and in concerts by the Eminence Orchestra. Music from Chrono Trigger and Cross made up one fourth of the music in the Symphonic Fantasies concerts in Cologne in September 2009 which were produced by the creators of the Symphonic Game Music Concert series and conducted by Arnie Roth. The concerts featured a suite of music from both games interspersed together with the pieces from Trigger comprising "A Premonition", "Battle with Magus", "Chrono Trigger", "Peaceful Days", "Outskirts of Time", "Frog's Theme", and "To Far Away Times", as well as a boss battle suite that featured "Lavos’ Theme". "Crono's Theme" was performed at the Press Start -Symphony of Games- 2007 concerts in Yokohama and Osaka, Japan, and a suite comprising music from Chrono Trigger and Cross was performed at the Press Start -Symphony of Games- 2008 concerts the following year in Tokyo and Shanghai. An arrangement of "Light of Silence" was performed on July 9, 2011 at the Symphonic Odysseys concert, which commemorated the music of Uematsu.

For the 20th anniversary in 2015, Mitsuda, along with his performing group Millennial Fair, performed tracks from the game at the Tokyo Globe in Tokyo, Japan on July 25 and 26. The event, titled "The Brink of Time", included Mitsuda performing on the piano, guitar, and Irish bouzouki.

References

External links
 Yasunori Mitsuda's official website
 Chrono Compendium Music - Listing of track information, official releases, fan albums, rearrangements and remixes

Music Of Chrono Trigger
Video game soundtracks
Yasunori Mitsuda albums